Nayakanahulikatti is a village in Dharwad district of Karnataka, India.

Demographics 
As of the 2011 Census of India there were 137 households in Nayakanahulikatti and a total population of 756 consisting of 385 males and 371 females. There were 95 children ages 0-6.

References

Villages in Dharwad district